Fabrizio Bentivoglio (born 4 January 1957) is an Italian cinema and theatre actor and screenwriter.

Biography
Fabrizio Bentivoglio was born in Milan (his father is Venetian). After only one season in the juvenile team of Inter, he left his sporting career because of an injury to his left knee and
attended the school of the Piccolo Teatro in Milan. He debuted on stage
acting in Timon of Athens by William Shakespeare and also pursued his artistic career in cinema.

Continuing his studies in medicine, he then moved to Rome. With
Dario de Luca and in association with Studio Universal he founded the
Tipota Movie Company.

With the band Piccola Orchestra Avion Travel he has staged the
show La guerra vista dalla luna. He has also filmed the short film Típota(1999) and has completed a tour performing his own songs.

The soundtrack of Eternity and a Day (Italy/France/Greece, 1998) by Theo Angelopoulos contains the track "The Poet", with Bentivoglio's voice.

Filmography

The Blue-Eyed Bandit (1980) - Riccardo - aka Rick
Masoch (1980) - Alexander
The Lady of the Camellias (1981) - Dumas son
La festa perduta (1981)
Vatican Conspiracy (1982) - Padre Bruno Martello
Woman of Wonders (1985) - Gianni
The Rover (1985, TV Movie)
Salomè (1986) - Yokanaan
Via Montenapoleone (1987) - Roberto
Regina (1987) - Lorenzo
Apartment Zero (1988) - Carlos Sanchez-Verne
Rebus (1989) - Raul Echegarraya
Marrakech Express (1989) - Marco
On Tour (1989, also writer)
Turné (1990) - Federico Lolli
The Peaceful Air of the West (1990) - Cesare
Italia - Germania 4-3 (1990) - Francesco
Red American (1991) - Vittorio Benvegnu
Puerto Escondido (1992) - Mario
The End Is Known (Italy / France, 1993) - Bernardo Manni
A Soul Split in Two (1993) - Pietro Di Leo
Like Two Crocodiles (1994) - Gabriele
Ordinary Hero (1995) - Giorgio Ambrosoli
School (1995) - Sperone
Livers Ain't Cheap (1996) - Alfredo Donati
The Elective Affinities (1996) - Ottone
Slaughter of the Cock (1996)
Sacred Silence (1996) - Don Lorenzo Borrelli
An Eyewitness Account (1997) - Piero Nava
Marianna Ucrìa (1997)
Le acrobate (1997) - Stefano
I cortiitaliani (1997)
Of Lost Love (1998) - Marco
Eternity and a Day (1998) - The Poet
Notes of Love (1998) - Antonio, Gerardo's father
The Nanny (1999) - Prof. Mori
Típota (Italy, 1999, Short) - Actor
The Missing (1999) - Monsignor Tommaso
Teeth (Italy, 2000) - Uncle Nino
Holy Tongue (2000) - Willy detto 'Alain Delon'
Magicians	(2000) - Hugo
Hotel (2001) - Very Important Doctor
A cavallo della tigre (2002) - Guido
Remember Me, My Love (2003) - Carlo Ristuccia
Love Returns (2004) - Luca Florio
La terra (2006) - Luigi Di Santo
The Family Friend (2006) - Gino
The Right Distance (2007) - Bengivenga
Don't Waste Your Time, Johnny! (2007, also director) - Augusto Riverberi
Happy Family (2010) - Vincenzo
A Second Childhood (2010) - Lino
Easy! (2011) - Prof. Bruno Beltrame
Tutto tutto niente niente (2012) - Sottosegretario
The Chair of Happiness (2013) - The 2nd Seller of Paintings
Human Capital (2013) - Dino Ossola
The Invisible Boy (2014) - Basili
Let's Talk (2015) - Alfredo
The Last Will Be the Last (2015) - Antonio Zanzotto
Forever Young (2016) - Giorgio
Sconnessi (2018) - Ettore Ranieri
Loro (2018) - Santino Recchia
The Name of the Rose (2019, TV Series) - Remigio da Varagine
Il flauto magico di Piazza Vittorio (2018) - Sarastro
The Invisible Witness (2018) - Tommaso
Croce e delizia (2019) - Tony
Rose Island (2020) - Franco Restivo

Stage

 Timoned'Atene	(Italy, 1978) 	(tragedy in five acts by William Shakespeare); production by Carlo Rivolta;
 La tempesta 	(Italy, 1978) 	(play in five acts by William Shakespeare); production by Giorgio Strehler;
 Iparentiterribili 	(Italy, 1979) 	(by Jean Cocteau); production by Franco Enriquez;
 Prima del silenzio	(Italy, 1980) 	(by Giuseppe Patroni-Griffi); production by Giorgio De Lullo;
 L'avaro 	(Italy, 1981) 	(by Molière); production by Mario Scaccia;
 La verastoria	(Italy, 1982) 	(by Luciano Berio and Italo Calvino); production by M. Scaparro, Teatro La Scala in Milan;
 Gliamantideimieiamantisonomieiamanti	(Italy, 1982) (by Giuseppe Patroni-Griffi); production by Giuseppe Patroni-Griffi;	
 Mettiuna sera a cena	(Italy, 1983) (by Giuseppe Patroni-Griffi); production by Giuseppe Patroni-Griffi;		
 D'amoresimuore	(Italy, 1985) 	(comedy by Giuseppe Patroni-Griffi); production by Giuseppe Patroni-Griffi;	
 Italia-Germania 4 a 3 	(Italy, 1987) 	(by Umberto Marino); regia di Sergio Rubini;
 La guerra vista dallaluna	(Italy, 1995) 	(little opera in one act PeppeServillo);
 La tempesta 	(Italy, 2000) 	(play in five acts by William Shakespeare); production by Giorgio BarberioCorsetti, Teatro Argentina in Rome;

Awards

 Venice, 11/09/1993 	CoppaVolpi for the Best Actor 	for A Soul Split in Two
 Venice, 11/09/1993 	PremioPasinetti for the Actor 	for A Soul Split in Two
 Grollad'oro 1993 	Best Actor 	for The End Is Known
 Ciakd'oro 1994 	Best Actor 	for A Soul Split in Two
 Montréal World Film Festival 1995 	Best Actor 	for Ordinary Hero
 Venice 1996 	PremioPasinetti for the Actor 	for PianeseNunzio, Fourteen in May
 Ciakd'oro 1997 	Best Actor 	for An Eyewitness Account
 Sacherd'oro 1997 	Best Actor 	for An Eyewitness Account
 David di Donatello 1996-1997 	Best Actor 	for An Eyewitness Account
 Venice 1999 	Premio FEDIC, special mention 	for Típota
 São Paulo International Film Festival 1999 	Best Short (Audience Award) 	for Típota
 David di Donatello 1998-1999 	Best Supporting Actor 	for Del perduto amore
 David di Donatello 1999-2000 	Nominated as Best Short 	for Típota
 Nastrid'argento 2000 	Best Producer of Shorts (to the Tipota Movie Company) 	for Típota and Il bambino con la pistola
 Taormina, 29/06-07/07/2001 Nastrid'argento 2001 	Nominated as Best Actor 	for Holy Tongue

References

External links
Biography

1957 births
Living people
Film people from Milan
Male actors from Milan
Italian screenwriters
David di Donatello winners
Nastro d'Argento winners
Ciak d'oro winners
Volpi Cup for Best Actor winners
Italian male screenwriters